Randall Thorne, better known by his pseudonyms RT! and R.T. Thorne, is a Canadian writer and television director known for creating deeply immersive visual worlds. He has emerged as one of Canada's most eclectic storytellers since debuting on the music video filmmaking scene over a decade ago. 

After winning 17 International music video awards, and working with international music artists like Drake and Snoop Dogg, R.T. moved into long-form filmmaking in 2012.

Filmography

Television 
R.T. Thorne has been tapped to direct television for NBCUniversal, Netflix, Disney, HULU and Bell Media. His international episodic television work has taken him to three continents, earning him two Canadian Screen Award Nominations, and a Directors Guild of Canada nomination. 

In 2015, R.T. wrote, directed and co-produced The Time Traveler, which won best short film at the Canadian Film Festival. 

In 2018, R.T. was accepted to the prestigious Toronto International Film Festival's Talent Lab to develop his debut feature.

In 2020, R.T. Created Utopia Falls, a genre bending, Afrofuturistic science fiction series that premiered as a HULU Original.

R.T. continues to follow his passion for storytelling, creating & developing commercially viable filmmaking properties from diverse cultural perspectives.

Awards
Over the course of ten years, RT! has received 17 international music video awards, including "Director of the Year" for two consecutive years at the MuchMusic Video Awards. Since the beginning of his career, RT! has been nominated every year at the MuchMusic awards, including six consecutive years in the Director of the Year category.

Including the MMVAs, RT! has been nominated for more than forty film and television industry awards.

Much Music Video Awards
2006: Best Video of 2006 for Kardinal Offishall – "Everyday Rudebwoy"
2006: Best Director for Kardinal Offishall – "Everyday Rudebwoy"
2006: Best Pop Video for Massari – "Be Easy"
2006: VideoFACT Award for Kardinal Offishall – "Everyday Rudebwoy"
2007: Best Director for George Nozuka - "Lie to Me"
2007: Best Rap Video for Belly feat. Ginuwine – "Pressure"
2008: Best Hip Hop Video for Belly feat. Mario Winans – "Ridin'"
2009: UR FAV Video for Simple Plan – "Save You"
2010: Best Hip Hop Video for Belly feat. Snoop Dogg – "Hot Girl"
2011: Best Video of 2011 for Shawn Desman – "Night Like This"
2011: Best Post Production for Danny Fernandes feat. Belly – "Automatic"
2013: Video of The Year for Classified ft. David Myles - "Inner Ninja"
2013: Muchfact Video Of The Year for Classified ft. David Myles - "Inner Ninja"

Other awards
2004: MTV/Urbanworld: Best Short Video for About 2 Change
2008: ECM Awards: Video of the Year for Joel Plaskett - "Fashionable People"
2009: ReelWorld Film Festival: Best Music Video for Simple Plan – "Save You"
2013: ReelWorld Film Festival: Best Short Film for "ALIVE"

The Remix Project
As of May 2012, Thorne serves on the board of directors of The Remix Project, a non-profit cultural incubator that aims to increase access to the "creative industries" for underprivileged and marginalized youth. In the Fall of 2009, the Remix Project partnered with Team Seven Productions and Temple Street Productions to create CITYLIFE, a new educational initiative that aimed to create short films from the voices of inner city youth. RT! is the Director of Programs for CITYLIFE which included running workshops as well as serving as a directing mentor to the participants.

References

External links
 

Black Canadian filmmakers
Canadian music video directors
Canadian people of Barbadian descent
Canadian people of Trinidad and Tobago descent
People from Calgary
Living people
Canadian television directors
Year of birth missing (living people)